Ivan Miroshnichenko may refer to:
 Ivan Miroshnichenko (politician)
 Ivan Miroshnichenko (ice hockey)